Richard A. Flintrop is a former member of the Wisconsin State Assembly.

Biography
Flintrop was born on December 15, 1945 in Milwaukee, Wisconsin. He graduated from East Troy High School in East Troy, Wisconsin before attending the University of Wisconsin-Oshkosh, American University and George Washington University.

Career
Flintrop was elected to the Assembly in 1972. In 1979, he was a candidate in the Democratic primary for the United States House of Representatives from Wisconsin's 6th congressional district, losing to Gary R. Goyke. Goyke would lose to Tom Petri in the general election. Additionally, Flintrop was Vice Chairman of the Winnebago County, Wisconsin Democratic Party.

References

Politicians from Milwaukee
People from East Troy, Wisconsin
People from Winnebago County, Wisconsin
Democratic Party members of the Wisconsin State Assembly
University of Wisconsin–Oshkosh alumni
American University alumni
George Washington University alumni
1945 births
Living people